Mickey Avalon (born Yeshe Perl; December 3, 1975) is an American rapper from Hollywood, California. His debut self-titled solo album was released Nov. 7, 2006 on Interscope/Shoot to Kill Records in association with MySpace Records. Frequent topics of Avalon's songs are his experiences with substance abuse and prostitution.

Early life
Avalon was raised in a Jewish family and had a turbulent childhood. His paternal grandparents were Holocaust survivors who were imprisoned at Auschwitz. Though his father cleaned up his act and began attending Alcoholics Anonymous, he was struck and severely injured by a drunk driver leaving a meeting. At age 19, Avalon made the decision to take his father off life support, ending his life. During his late teens, Avalon briefly adhered to Orthodox Judaism in an effort to stay off the streets. Avalon continued as a sex worker and drug dealer until finding success in the music industry. By his early 20s, Avalon married, had a daughter, and moved to Portland, Oregon. While battling drug addiction, Avalon moved in with his sister (also a drug addict) with the hope that they could aid each other in recovery. During this time, his sister relapsed and died from a heroin overdose. Deciding that he wanted more out of life, Avalon moved back to Los Angeles to make a final attempt to clean up his act. It was shortly after this return to Southern California that Avalon met Simon Rex and began to gain recognition for his music. He also met Kevin Spacey  during this time period and became his personal pool boy.

Street art
Avalon is a member of the Los Angeles-based graffiti crew CBS (Can't Be Stopped / City Bomb Squad).

Personal life
Avalon has two younger half-brothers (who are identical twins). He has helped them relocate to the Los Angeles area and enter the music industry.

Mickey Avalon was the main investor in a series of self-named apartment complexes in Camarillo, California and Sunnyvale, California.

Style
The majority of Avalon's work has themes of hard drug use, particularly in reference to his consumption of heroin and crack cocaine, an unusual style in hip hop, where the artist more commonly refers to the sale of such substances. Another popular theme in Avalon's music is his seduction, and sexual encounters with men and women. This is coupled with his overtly sexualized image, often performing with heavy eye makeup and no shirt.

Career
Upon moving to Los Angeles, he was befriended by ex-MTV VJ Simon Rex who encouraged Avalon to rap and collaborated with him. The two began passing out demos to Hollywood clubs and soon developed a following among fans of the Santa Cruz nightclub scene.

Upon entering the rap scene in 2000, Avalon first adopted the stage name, "The Relevant" and made his first appearance on Met Fly (who would later be known as Andre Legacy)'s album entitled "Wiggin' Out".  In 2004, Avalon first collaborated with Existereo of the Shape Shifters's on the song "No Class." He later collaborated with Existereo again on: "Couple o'Shitbags & The Fly's That Go With 'em" (2005), "Wrong Side" (2006), "I Love Who" (2007).

In November 2006, Mickey Avalon released his self-titled debut solo album. Released through Interscope/Shoot to Kill Records in association with MySpace Records, the album spawned the singles "Jane Fonda" and "Mr. Right". In January 2007, Avalon contributed lyrics and vocals on Unwritten Law's "Shoulda Known Better." That same year, he was featured in a Boost Mobile rap commercial with fellow rappers Jermaine Dupri and Young Jeezy.

In 2011, after years of back and forth wrangling with Interscope, Mickey was released from his recording contract. He is currently signed to Suburban Noize Records. On March 12, 2012 he digitally released a 4-track EP entitled On the Ave. His second solo album, Loaded was released on April 24, 2012.

On October 1, 2013, Mickey Avalon released a 5 track EP titled I Get Even Even, and then later released a music video for the track Hollywood (feat. Paul Oakenfold).

Three years later on November 25, 2016, he announced that his third album, Teardrops on My Tombstone would be available on Valentine's Day 2017.

Dyslexic Speedreaders
After Mickey became close friends with Simon Rex, they formed a rap group called the Dyslexic Speedreaders. The group included Mickey Avalon, Simon "Dirt Nasty" Rex, Andre Legacy, and Beardo as the four members. Andre Legacy was Avalon's friend since elementary school and Beardo was Avalon's friend from their work together in the modelling industry. In 2004, the Dyslexic Speedreaders released their first album which was entitled Catching Up To Wilt. In 2007, the Dyslexic Speedreaders collaborated with the Living Legends and Luckiam on the song, "Nevermind." In 2008, the Dyslexic Speedreaders released the Shoot To Kill Mixtape. In 2009, Mickey Avalon released "What Do You Say?" which was also part of The Hangover soundtrack and featured Dirt Nasty and Andre Legacy. However, Avalon announced through his Myspace page that this would be the last song that the Dyslexic Speedreaders would release.

After years of friendship and musical collaborations, the group disbanded after Mickey had a dispute with the other members over unpaid loans. On November 7, 2010, Avalon announced on theFIVE10 Radio that he was leaving his label and that his relationship with Dirt Nasty and Andre Legacy had been strained due to money issues. He told JC of theFIVE10 Radio that Dirt Nasty and Andre Legacy never paid him back for all the money he had put into developing them and that was the reason they were not talking. He stated that there was still room for reconciliation by saying, "No one slept with anyone's chick." Dirt Nasty is reported to have responded to Avalon's comment, stating "Well I know that Avalon didn't sleep with ANY chicks, because everyone knows that he prefers dick."

During his July 31, 2011 interview on Stefanie's Rock Show, Avalon stated that he briefly reunited with the Dyslexic Speedreaders for an unplanned one time performance. He attended the Roxy with his daughter while Dirt Nasty and Andre Legacy were scheduled to perform that night. During the course of the show, Avalon accepted an invitation to perform on stage with his former bandmates. He said he is open to the possibility of future reunions. In November 2015, Mickey Avalon and Dirt Nasty officially reconciled by releasing a 5-song collaborative EP entitled "Married to the Game".

Controversy
In March 2007, Avalon was booed off the stage while opening for the Red Hot Chili Peppers, in Oklahoma City. The next day, Red Hot Chili Peppers lead guitarist John Frusciante wrote a letter to the band's fans in Oklahoma City, accusing them of booing Avalon for personal issues, and having a lack of "regard for humanity."

Tours
 "Stroke Me Tour" (2009) (Feat. Beardo & Kesha)
 "Blazed & Confused Tour" (2009)
 "Loaded/Jaegermeister Tour" (2012)
 "Teardrops on my Tombstone” (2015)
 "Married to the Game Tour" with Dirt Nasty  (2016)

Discography

Singles
 "Jane Fonda" (2006) - Self Titled (#36 Billboard Modern Rock Tracks chart)
 "Mr. Right" (2007) - Self Titled
 "Fuckin Em All" (2009) - Non Album
 "What Do You Say?" (2009) - The Hangover Soundtrack
 "Stroke Me" (2007) - Non Album
 "I Wanna" (2010) - Non Album
 "I Luv LA!" (2010) - Non Album
 "Tight Blue Jeans" (2011) - Loaded
 "Rock Bottom" (2011) - Loaded
 "I'm Hot" (2012) - Loaded
 "Mr Right" (2013) - Loaded
 "More Junk" (2012) - Loaded
 "Girlfriend" (2012) - Loaded
 "I Like It Raw" (Feat. Speedball) (2012)
 "Hollywood" (Feat. Paul Oakenfold) (2013)
 "Red Light District" (2018)
 "End of My Line" (2018)
 "Dolly Parton" (2018)
 "Freeway" (2018)
 "Jacques Cousteau" (2018)
 "Future Atomic" (2018)
 "Two Time Loser" (2018)
 "Another Quarter" (2018)
 "Blue Medusa" (2018)
 "Davy Crockett" (2018)
 "Billy Shakespeare" (2018)
 "Black Trans-Am" (2019)
 "Woke AF" (2020)
 "Ultra-Violence" (2020)

References

External links

 Official website
 Video Interview with Mickey Avalon
 Audio Interview with Mickey Avalon

1975 births
Living people
Jewish American musicians
American hip hop musicians
Jewish rappers
Musicians from Los Angeles
People from Hollywood, Los Angeles
Rappers from California
American male prostitutes
21st-century American rappers
21st-century American Jews